Cesar E. Chavez High School opened in 2003 and serves 1,650 students in grades nine through twelve.

Located at the southern part of the Central San Joaquin Valley, Delano is an agricultural community which straddles the southern end of Tulare County and northern Kern County.  Cesar E. Chavez High School serves students residing in Delano as well as the surrounding rural communities and/or districts.  These feeder districts include, Earlimart, Pond, Allensworth, Richgrove and Columbine. The School was named after Cesar E. Chavez in his honor. In Houston, Texas has a high school named after the activist also, Chávez High School (Houston).

References

High schools in Kern County, California
Public high schools in California
2003 establishments in California